Route 35 is a  state highway in the U.S. State of Massachusetts running through the towns of Danvers and Peabody in northeastern Massachusetts. Its southern terminus is at Route 114 in Peabody and its northern terminus is at Route 97 in Topsfield.

Route description
Route 35 begins at Route 114 in Peabody, as that route turns left off the right-of-way towards Route 128 and the Northshore Mall.  After passing Bishop Fenwick High, Route 35 enters Danvers in the Danversport section of that town.  It crosses the Waters River and Crane River before making a left turn, crossing under Route 128 at Exits 23 North & South.  The road goes through downtown Danvers before turning northward, intersecting Route 62.  It heads through the Putnamville section of Danvers, passing the Putnamville Reservoir (also known as the Beverly & Danvers Reservoir) before finally ending just yards over the Topsfield and Wenham town lines at Route 97.

Major intersections

References

035